The 1997 New York Mets season was the 36th regular season for the Mets. They went 88-74 and finished 3rd in the NL East. They were managed by Bobby Valentine. They played home games at Shea Stadium.

Offseason
 November 25, 1996: Paul Byrd and a player to be named later were traded by the Mets to the Atlanta Braves for Greg McMichael. The Mets completed the deal by sending Andy Zwirchitz (minors) to the Braves on May 25, 1997.
 November 27, 1996: Rico Brogna was traded by the Mets to the Philadelphia Phillies for Ricardo Jordan and Toby Borland.
 December 20, 1996: Robert Person was traded by the Mets to the Toronto Blue Jays for John Olerud and cash.
 March 22, 1997: Héctor Ramírez was traded by the Mets to the Baltimore Orioles for Scott McClain and Manny Alexander.

Regular season
For the first time since 1990 the Mets finished the regular season with a winning record. Their offensive output was led by their corner infielders, the 23-year old third baseman Edgardo Alfonzo and the two-time former world champion first baseman John Olerud, the latter of whom was acquired in a trade with the Toronto Blue Jays. Alfonzo, in his first full season as a starter, led the team with a .315 average and 163 hits while Olerud notched a .294 average and drove in 102 runs to lead the Mets in that category. Catcher Todd Hundley, a year removed from his record setting 1996 campaign, led the team in home runs with 30 and added 86 RBI, one of five Mets to record 70 or more (joining Alfonzo, Olerud, Bernard Gilkey, and Butch Huskey).

After a year out of baseball, Rick Reed joined the Mets' starting rotation and led them with a 2.89 ERA. Bobby Jones led with fifteen wins, with Reed recording thirteen. John Franco saved 36 games, his most since 1988.

Jackie Robinson tribute
On April 15 the Mets hosted ceremonies marking the 50th anniversary of Jackie Robinson's first game with the Brooklyn Dodgers before their game against the Los Angeles Dodgers at Shea Stadium. The ceremony was attended by President Bill Clinton and commissioner Bud Selig announced that Robinson's jersey number, 42, would be retired permanently across baseball. The Mets won the game 5-0.

Subway Series
Interleague play was brought to MLB in 1997 and the Mets played New York Yankees in June as part of the first ever regular season games that counted in the standings between the two teams (they had previously an exhibition game until 1983 during the season). The series took place at Yankee Stadium, and Mets won the first game by a score of 6-0.

Season standings

Record vs. opponents

Notable transactions
 June 3, 1997: 1997 Major League Baseball Draft
Garrett Atkins was drafted by the Mets in the 10th round, but did not sign.
Jeremy Guthrie was drafted by the Mets in the 15th round, but did not sign.
 August 8, 1997: Lance Johnson and players to be named later were traded by the Mets to the Chicago Cubs for Brian McRae, Mel Rojas and Turk Wendell. The Mets completed the deal by sending Mark Clark to the Cubs on August 11 and Manny Alexander to the Cubs on August 14.

Roster

Player stats

Batting

Starters by position
Note: Pos = Position; G = Games played; AB = At bats; H = Hits; Avg. = Batting average; HR = Home runs; RBI = Runs batted in

Other batters
Note: G = Games played; AB = At bats; H = Hits; Avg. = Batting average; HR = Home runs; RBI = Runs batted in

Pitching

Starting pitchers
Note; G = Games pitched; IP = Innings pitched; W = Wins; L = Losses; ERA = Earned run average; SO = Strikeouts

Other pitchers
Note; G = Games pitched; IP = Innings pitched; W = Wins; L = Losses; ERA = Earned run average; SO = Strikeouts

Relief pitchers
Note: G = Games pitched; W = Wins; L = Losses; SV = Saves; ERA = Earned run average; SO = Strikeouts

Farm system

League champions: Pittsfield, GCL Mets

References

External links
1997 New York Mets at Baseball Reference
1997 New York Mets team page at www.baseball-almanac.com

New York Mets seasons
New York Mets season
New York Mets
1990s in Queens